Prain Global Inc. (Hangul:주식회사 프레인 글로벌) is a South Korean public relations company, founded by Yeo Jun-young in July 2000. It is the parent company of the Prain Consulting Group (PCG).

In 2021, Prain Global was ranked 73rd on the Global Top 250 PR Agency Ranking.

Prain Consulting Group
The Prain Consulting Group is the group of companies under Prain Global.

 Prain Global - Public relations (Site) 
 Prain IMC - integrated marketing communications
 Prain TPC  - artist management (Facebook) (@PrainTPC on Twitter)  
 Prain Movie - film distribution (Facebook)  
 Prain Sports - sports marketing
 Prain & Rhee - research, consulting
 Prain F&B - food and baking franchisee
 Purearena (Blogger Korea) 
 TREY - hybrid public relations (Tistory)
 Markers BX - branding (Tistory)
 Markers UX - digital agency (Tistory)
 PCG Academy  - educational institution
 PCG HQ - business incubator
 Sticky Monster Lab  - animation studio (Facebook) (Vimeo)

Clients (as of 2022)

Government & public sector
 The National Institute of Korean Language
 Ministry of Economy and Finance
 Ministry of Culture, Sports and Tourism
 Ministry of Government Legislation
 Ministry of Health and Welfare
 Seoul City Hall
 Child Rights Security Agency
 Ministry of Foreign Affairs
 United Nations World Food Programme
 Incheon International Airport Corporation
 Statistics Korea

Consumer products & retail
 Gong Cha
 Kia
 Nu Skin Korea
 Danone Nutricia
 Dr.jart+
 Dongsuh Foods
 Monami
 Michelin Korea
 Volvo Cars
 SKIN1004
 Simmons
 Aromatica
 APR
 Yuhan-Kimberly
 Dr.Chung’s Food
 Zero to Seven
 Zespri Korea
 Cardoc
 Pernod Ricard Korea
 POSCO
 PLEATS MAMA
 K CAR
 FromBIO
 11Street

Corporate
 Neovalue
 Digital Daesung
 Ssangyong C&E
 Alibaba
 UBASE
 Electronic Arts Korea
 DL
 DTR
 SK Group

Technology & digital
 Riot Games
 Roborock Korea
 Samsung
 Sejong Telecom
 Onestore
 Keywe
 Thinkware
 Plus-ex
 KIES
 Fujifilm
 KIAST
 E-pit
 SK Telecom
 TESSA

Healthcare
 Daewoong
 Korean Association of Interpreters and Presidents
 Korean Society for Lung Arterial Research
 Dongkook
 Mundipharma
 Sanofi Aventis
 Sanofi Pasteur
 Smail Pharm
 Takeda
 Roche
 AbbVie
 HANALL Biopharma
 MSD
 Novartis
 GSK

Travel, leisure & sports
 Expedia
 Fairmont Ambassador Seoul
 Finnair

Media & entertainment
 TikTok
 FLO
 LYCHEE&FRIENDS

Financial services & others
 JT Chinae Bank
 Forestry and Fisheries Food Education and Culture Information Service
 Solt
 ESG

Honors

2017
2017 The Holmes Report - ‘North Asia Consultancy of the year’-The Holmes Report
2017 Asia Pacific SABRE Awards - Gold Award in ‘Public Affairs’ (Ministry of Health and Welfare, ‘Ga Na Da campaign, to promote and raise awareness for low fertility compared to an aging society)
The Korean Advertising & PR Practitioners Society - ‘2017 PR Agency of the Year’
Award of Excellence in Advertising and Public Service Campaign, Korea Communications Grand Prize (Ministry of Culture, Sports and Tourism, Hello Policy Project – Online viral video on communication)

2016
Korean Academic Society for Public Relations Excellence Award -’Best PR Practice Award 2016’ by the (Grevin Seoul)
2016 PR Week Asia Silver Winner of the Southeast Asia PR Campaign of the Year in 2016 (Crossing Cultural Borders: Promoting Korean Halal Foods in Indonesia of Korea Agro-Fisheries&Food Trade Corporation)
6th Korea Social Network Service Award - Grand Prize winner in Manufacturer category by (Posco)
2016 Korea PR Association Award - Grand Prize winner (Ministry of Health and Welfare’s Aging Society and Population Policy campaign, ‘Ga, Na, Da campaign’)
2016 Korea PR Association Award - ‘PR Agency of the Year’

2015
Award of Excellence in PR-Event Sector Outstanding Performance, Korea Communications Grand Prize (MSD Rotateq)
Best Company in Promotion Opportunity & Possibility Sector, Fortune & Jobplanet

2014
This Year’s Best PR Agency by Korean University Students’ PR Association
Grand Prize, in 2014 Korea PR Association Awards (Campaign of Ministry of Employment and Labor)
Sungbong Lee, Vice-chairman of Prain, selected as ‘The 50 Most Influential People in PR’ by PR Week
Korean Consultancy of the Year by Asia Pacific SABRE Awards

References

External links
 

Companies established in 2000
Public relations companies
Advertising agencies of South Korea